Benji Durden (born August 28, 1951) is a Boulder, Colorado based runner and former running coach who came to prominence as a distance runner in the early 1980s, at the height of the American running boom. Durden was a member of the titular 1980 Summer Olympics United States marathon team, placing second against what to that point was perhaps the deepest field of American marathoners ever assembled. With a personal record of 2:09:57, Durden recorded 25 sub-2:20 marathons in less than a decade. He ranked among the top ten US marathoners six straight years, reaching seventh in the world in 1982.

Early life and education

Durden ran track in Sacramento, California as a youth, aspiring to become a miler. After moving to Georgia, he attended Wayne County High School where he set school records in the mile (4:36) and 880 (2:04). After graduation he went to the University of Georgia, in Athens (UGA), where he ran the mile in 4:15 as a freshman. He graduated from UGA in 1973.

After college, Durden moved to Stone Mountain, becoming a fixture on the Atlanta-area running scene while working at Jeff Galloway’s Phidippides running shop.

Durden won the inaugural Cooper River Bridge Run, which was shortened to 9,850 meters by authorities after the gun started for the race, in 1978.

1980 Olympic Trials

In 1980, on a course running from Buffalo, New York, to Niagara Falls, Ontario, Durden finished second in the symbolic US Olympic Trials (the boycott had already been announced by the time the Trials were held in May) against one of the deepest field of American marathoners ever assembled. Durden surged into the lead at the 18 mile mark and built up a ten second advantage over the lead runners until Anthony Sandoval caught him in the 23rd mile.  Sandoval pulled away in the 24th mile and went on to win the race. Durden finished second in a time of 2:10:40.3, a personal best by over three minutes.

The race was intended to determine the US Olympic team for the marathon at that summer's Summer Olympics in Moscow, USSR; however, President Carter had ordered the team to sit out the Olympics. Durden did however receive one of 461 Congressional Gold Medals created especially for the spurned athletes.

Marathon career
Durden's marathon career debuted at the 1974 Peach Bowl Marathon. After he dropped out, he told friends, "Anyone who runs a marathon is sick."

In 1975, Durden returned to the Peach Bowl Marathon, seeking to break 2:23, the Olympic trials qualifying mark for the 1976 Summer Olympics. He finished in 2:36:19, well off the qualifying standard. But at the 1976 AAU National Marathon Championship Rice Festival Marathon in Lafayette, Louisiana, he finished second in 2:20:23.

Durden's first marathon win came in 1977, in Columbia, South Carolina (which had a marathon at the time; that race was last run in 2000 as the U. S. Olympic Women's Marathon Trials) in 2:19.04.

Durden lowered his personal bests with impressive races at the 1979 Nike/OTC marathon (2:13:47) and the New York City Marathon (2:13:49), before having his big breakthrough in the 1980 "Olympic Trials" race. His time of 2:09:57 in the 1983 Boston Marathon, where he finished third, is his lifetime best.

As a Masters runner (40 and over), Durden once again ran the Atlanta Marathon in 1991 winning in 2:28:52. He followed that victory by winning the Masters division of the Huntsville Marathon in 2:32:48.

Durden continues to run, returning to Huntsville, Alabama (where he had finished his last marathon fourteen years earlier), and competed in his first marathon as a Grand Masters (50 and older) runner in 2005, finishing in 3:08:34.  In December, 2006, he returned to Sacramento where he recorded a time of 3:01:03 at the California International Marathon. In 2013 he completed a goal of running a marathon in all 50 states plus D.C. in under 4 hours. As of 2020 he had completed 136 marathons.

Achievements

Source:Association of Road Racing Statisticians (ARRS) Runner:Benji Durden

References

External links
 Boston.com - 'Meyer, Benoit Score for Massachusetts' (April 18, 1983)
 CopacabanaRunners.net - 'Run Long', Benji Durden (1996)
 Prismnet.com - 'The Path to Marathon Success', Benji Durden
 RunningTimes.com - 'Still Running, Still Dreaming... ...Still Benji', John A. Kissane, Running Times (January, 2006)

1951 births
Living people
American male long-distance runners
Georgia Bulldogs track and field athletes
Sportspeople from Georgia (U.S. state)
American male marathon runners
Congressional Gold Medal recipients
Track and field athletes from Sacramento, California